In mathematical morphology, opening is the dilation of the erosion of a set A by a structuring element B:

where  and  denote erosion and dilation, respectively.

Together with closing, the opening serves in computer vision and image processing as a basic workhorse of morphological noise removal. Opening removes small objects from the foreground (usually taken as the bright pixels) of an image, placing them in the background, while closing removes small holes in the foreground, changing small islands of background into foreground. These techniques can also be used to find specific shapes in an image. Opening can be used to find things into which a specific structuring element can fit (edges, corners, ...).

One can think of B sweeping around the inside of the boundary of A, so that it does not extend beyond the boundary, and shaping the A boundary around the boundary of the element.

Properties

 Opening is idempotent, that is, .
 Opening is increasing, that is, if , then .
 Opening is anti-extensive, i.e., .
 Opening is translation invariant.
 Opening and closing satisfy the duality , where  denotes closing.

Extension: Opening by reconstruction 
In morphological opening  , the erosion operation removes objects that are smaller than structuring element B and the dilation operation (approximately) restores the size and shape of the remaining objects. However, restoration accuracy in the dilation operation depends highly on the type of structuring element and the shape of the restoring objects. The opening by reconstruction method is able to restore the objects more completely after erosion has been applied.

 

As a result, the marker image is a subset of the mask image   (Strictly, this holds for binary masks only. However, similar statements hold when the mask is not binary.)

The images below present a simple opening-by-reconstruction example which extracts the vertical strokes from an input text image. Since the original image is converted from grayscale to binary image, it has a few distortions in some characters so that same characters might have different vertical lengths. In this case, the structuring element is an 8-pixel vertical line which is applied in the erosion operation in order to find objects of interest. Moreover, morphological reconstruction by dilation,  iterates  times until the resulting image converges.

See also
Mathematical morphology
Closing
Dilation
Erosion

Bibliography
 Image Analysis and Mathematical Morphology by Jean Serra,  (1982)
 Image Analysis and Mathematical Morphology, Volume 2: Theoretical Advances by Jean Serra,  (1988)
 An Introduction to Morphological Image Processing by Edward R. Dougherty,  (1992)

External links
 http://homepages.inf.ed.ac.uk/rbf/HIPR2/open.htm - Morphological Opening

References 

 Digital Image Processing (Third Edition) by Rafael C. Gonzalez and Richard E. Woods, (2008)

Mathematical morphology